Hololena is a genus of North American funnel weavers first described by R. V. Chamberlin & Willis J. Gertsch in 1929.

Species
 it contains thirty species:

Hololena adnexa (Chamberlin & Gertsch, 1929) – USA
Hololena aduma Chamberlin & Ivie, 1942 – USA
Hololena altura Chamberlin & Ivie, 1942 – USA
Hololena atypica Chamberlin & Ivie, 1942 – USA
Hololena barbarana Chamberlin & Ivie, 1942 – USA
Hololena curta (McCook, 1894) – USA, Canada
Hololena dana Chamberlin & Ivie, 1942 – USA
Hololena frianta Chamberlin & Ivie, 1942 – USA
Hololena furcata (Chamberlin & Gertsch, 1929) – USA
Hololena hola (Chamberlin, 1928) – USA
Hololena hopi Chamberlin & Ivie, 1942 – USA
Hololena lassena Chamberlin & Ivie, 1942 – USA
Hololena madera Chamberlin & Ivie, 1942 – USA
Hololena mimoides (Chamberlin, 1919) – USA
Hololena monterea Chamberlin & Ivie, 1942 – USA
Hololena nedra Chamberlin & Ivie, 1942 – USA
Hololena nevada (Chamberlin & Gertsch, 1929) – USA
Hololena oola Chamberlin & Ivie, 1942 – USA
Hololena oquirrhensis (Chamberlin & Gertsch, 1930) – USA
Hololena pacifica (Banks, 1896) – USA
Hololena parana Chamberlin & Ivie, 1942 – USA
Hololena pearcei Chamberlin & Ivie, 1942 – USA
Hololena rabana Chamberlin & Ivie, 1942 – USA
Hololena santana Chamberlin & Ivie, 1942 – USA
Hololena septata Chamberlin & Ivie, 1942 – USA, Mexico
Hololena sidella Chamberlin & Ivie, 1942 – USA
Hololena sula Chamberlin & Ivie, 1942 – USA
Hololena tentativa (Chamberlin & Gertsch, 1929) – USA
Hololena tulareana Chamberlin & Ivie, 1942 – USA
Hololena turba Chamberlin & Ivie, 1942 – USA

References

External links

Agelenidae
Araneomorphae genera
Spiders of North America